Sharon Marko (born March 1953) is a former candidate for the U.S. House of Representatives from the Second District of Minnesota. She ran for the DFL party nomination, opposite Coleen Rowley, but announced the end of her campaign after less than two months, saying she had entered the race too late and that her current duties in the Minnesota Senate didn't leave her enough time to campaign.

Marko's exit left Rowley no significant competitors for the 2nd district DFL candidacy. Rowley won the candidacy, but lost the general election to two-term incumbent Republican congressman John Kline.

Marko entered the race on February 1, 2006, seven months later than her DFL rival, Rowley. Commenting on Rowley, Marko said "I've just noticed the occasional lack of professional ability."  She announced her withdrawal from the campaign on March 29.

Marko is a veteran local and state lawmaker. She spent three years on the Clearwater city council, eight years in the Minnesota House, and the past four years in the Minnesota Senate. She has held senior leadership positions in the Minnesota legislature.

Marko is married and has two children. She holds a BA from Indiana University. She lives in Surprise, Arizona where she serves as mayor under her married name of Wolcott.

External links 

Marko to challenge Rowley in DFL primary, Minnesota Public Radio.
Marko out of 2nd District congressional race, Minnesota Public Radio.
Senator Sharon Marko (DFL) District 57, at Minnesota Senate website.

Living people
Democratic Party members of the Minnesota House of Representatives
Democratic Party Minnesota state senators
Women state legislators in Minnesota
1953 births
Place of birth missing (living people)
21st-century American politicians
21st-century American women politicians